Lepidogma wiltshirei is a species of snout moth in the genus Lepidogma. It was described by Hans Georg Amsel in 1949 and is known from Iraq (including the type location Baghdad).

References

Moths described in 1949
Epipaschiinae